Feliksas Daukantas (6 February 1915 in Cicero, Illinois – 12 August 1995 in Vilnius, Lithuania) was a Lithuanian jeweller, designer, pioneer of design specialty in Lithuania.

Daukantas developed a methodological framework for design particularity; always cared for Lithuanian design achievements dissemination in the press. Daukantas made an invaluable contribution to Lithuania's jewelry culture: he changed the concept of amber jewelry. Because of the artist changed attitudes towards amber jewelry design and the conception of substance.

Biography
In 1947, he gained the specialty in sculpture at Vilnius Art Institute and turned into other fields of creativity that had come into contact with the plasticity of sculpture and creation of form.

In 1949-1961, he worked at Vilnius Art Factory DAILĖ. Daukantas made original amber jewellery, worked in the fields of industrial graphics, visual communication, created sculptures, wood and metal ware, leather samplers (standards) for mass production, toys. While being engaged in the practical artistic work he started incubating an idea about training of professional developers of material environment, specialists of industrial design, with which in 1961 he came to Vilnius Art Institute (from 1990 Vilnius Academy of Arts), where in the same year he founded Industry Products Artistic Design Department, became its lecturer and supervisor (until 1985); since 1979 he worked as a professor.

In 1987, the department was renamed to Design Department. Daukantas himself organized the material base of the department, brought together academics, drafted study plans; he was the first in the country to form a concept of a design specialist, formerly known as a designer of industrially manufactured items and material environment (the first graduates of this specialty were named as industrial products’ arts design artists) and set the place of design discipline among other disciplines and a designer’s position in society. 

Since 1950, Daukantas participated in art exhibitions, where he usually exhibited amber articles. Individual exhibitions were held in Palanga (in 1974 and 1995) and Vilnius (in 1975 and 1995). For Vilnius Central Post Office he designed the system for operational visual symbols (in 1969). He was the creator of covers for periodicals Žemės ūkis (Agriculture), Statyba ir architektūra (Construction and Architecture); he published articles about industrial art, home environment aesthetics.

See also

Lithuanian design
List of Lithuanian painters

References
Universal Lithuanian Encyclopedia

1915 births
1995 deaths
People from Cicero, Illinois
Artists from Vilnius
American people of Lithuanian descent
20th-century Lithuanian painters
Lithuanian designers
Lithuanian design
American emigrants to Lithuania
Soviet designers